Kenneth Joseph Cole (born February 13, 1936) is a former Democratic member of the Pennsylvania House of Representatives.

References

Democratic Party members of the Pennsylvania House of Representatives
Living people
1936 births